Wodajo Bulti (born 11 March 1957) is a retired Ethiopian long-distance runner who specialized in the 5000 metres, 10000 metres and cross-country running.

Career
Wodajo was one of the most significant Ethiopian middle and long-distance runners in 1980s. In his early years on the track he concentrated more on shorter distances such as 1500 metres because of great depth of Ethiopian talent over longer distances. He spent these years in the shadow of great Miruts Yifter, double Olympic Champion from Moscow and Mohamed Kedir, Olympic and World Cup medalist.

His breakthrough came in 1982, at 25 years of age, when Wodajo finished at third place over 1500 m at the 1982 African Championships in Athletics in Cairo and followed it by the gold medal at 5000 metres. On 16 September in Rieti, he won at 5000 m in huge personal best time of 13:07.29 minutes, recording third fastest time ever. With such achievements behind him, he was somewhat disappointed when finished at seventh place over 5000 m at next year's inaugural 1983 World Championships in Athletics in Helsinki.

In 1984, he was strong 5000 m medal contender for the Olympic Games in Los Angeles, finishing second in Florence behind Said Aouita in a time of 13:10.08 minutes (fourth in the yearly rankings), but was unable to compete in the Olympics due to the Ethiopian boycott. At the Friendship Games in Moscow, Bulti came third at 5000 m and second at 10,000 metres, breaking the 28 minute barrier. After these performances, Wodajo exploded in 1985 and opened season with the bronze medal at the 1985 IAAF World Cross Country Championships, finishing behind Carlos Lopes and Paul Kipkoech. At the African Championships, he became champion at both, 5000 m and 10,000 m distances, beating many great runners and relegating Kipkoech to second respectively third place. He was elected to represent Africa over both distances at the World Cup in Canberra and at day one, he won the gold over longer distance thanks to his fast finish and followed it by the bronze medal performance over 5000 m.

Bulti concentrated on longer distances for the remainder of his career and in 1987, he won in Helsinki over 10,000 m in new personal best time of 27:29.41 minutes which placed him second at 1987 world lists, but finished a disastrous 24th at the World Championships in Rome. He set career best of 2:08:44 finishing third in Rotterdam Marathon in 1988, but again, he was unable to compete at the Olympic Games in Seoul, due to the continued Ethiopian boycott.

Achievements

External links

1957 births
Living people
Ethiopian male long-distance runners
World Athletics Championships athletes for Ethiopia
Ethiopian male cross country runners
Friendship Games medalists in athletics
20th-century Ethiopian people